A logarithmic resistor ladder is an electronic circuit composed of a series of resistors and switches, designed to create an attenuation from an input to an output signal, where the logarithm of the attenuation ratio is proportional to a digital code word that represents the state of the switches.

The logarithmic behavior of the circuit is its main differentiator in comparison with digital-to-analog converters in general, and traditional R-2R Ladder networks specifically. Logarithmic attenuation is desired in situations where a large dynamic range needs to be handled. The circuit described in this article is applied in audio devices, since human perception of sound level is properly expressed on a logarithmic scale.

Logarithmic input/output behavior 
As in digital-to-analog converters, a binary word is applied to the ladder network, whose N bits are treated as representing an integer value according to the relation:
 where  represents a value 0 or 1 depending on the state of the ith switch.

For a conventional DAC or R-2R network, the output signal value (its voltage) would be:
(DA-converters that are designed to handle a variable input voltage are
termed multiplying DAC.)

In contrast, the logarithmic ladder network discussed in this article creates a behavior as:
 where  is a variable input signal.

Circuit implementation 

This example circuit is composed of 4 stages, numbered 1 to 4, and an additional leading Rsource and trailing Rload.

Each stage i has a designed input-to-output voltage attenuation ratioi as:

For logarithmic scaled attenuators, it is common practice to express their attenuation in decibels:

This reveals a basic property: 

To show that this  satisfies the overall intention:

The different stages 1 .. N should function independently of each other, as to obtain 2N different states with a composable behavior. To achieve an attenuation of each stage that is independent of its surrounding stages, either one of two design choices is to be implemented: constant input resistance or constant output resistance. Because the stages operate independently, they can be inserted in the chain in any order.

Constant input resistance 
The input resistance of any stage shall be independent of its on/off switch position, and must be equal to Rload.

This leads to:

With these equations, all resistor values of the circuit diagram follow easily after choosing values for N,  and Rload. (The value of Rsource does not influence the logarithmic behavior)

Constant output resistance 
The output resistance of any stage shall be independent of its on/off switch position, and must be equal to Rsource.

This leads to:

Again, all resistor values of the circuit diagram follow easily after choosing values for N,  and Rsource. (The value of Rload does not influence the logarithmic behavior).

For example, with a Rload of 1 kΩ, and 1 dB attenuation, the resistor values would be:
Ra   = 108.7 Ω, 
Rb  = 8195.5 Ω.

The next step (2 dB) would use: Ra   = 369.0 Ω, 
Rb  = 1709.7 Ω.

Circuit variations 
 The circuit as depicted above, can also be applied in reverse direction. That correspondingly reverses the role of constant-input and constant-output resistance equations.
 Since the stages do not influence each other's attenuation, the stage order can be chosen arbitrarily. Such reordering can have a significant effect on the input resistance of the constant output resistance attenuator and vice versa.

Background 
R-2R ladder networks used for Digital-to-Analog conversion are rather old. A historic description is in a patent filed in 1955.

Multiplying DA-converters with logarithmic behavior were not known for a long time after that. An initial approach was to map the logarithmic code to a much longer code word, which could be applied to the classical (linear) R-2R based DA-converter. Lengthening the codeword is needed in that approach to achieve sufficient dynamic range. This approach was implemented in a device from Analog Devices Inc., protected through a 1981 patent filing.

See also 
 Resistor ladder
 Digital-to-analog converter
 Attenuator circuits

References

External links 
 Online calculator to configure logarithmic ladder networks

Analog circuits